Edward Nasserden (6 April 1919 at Clarks Crossing, Saskatchewan – 13 November 1995)  was a Canadian politician, executive director and farmer. Nasserden was a Progressive Conservative party member of the House of Commons of Canada.

He was first elected at the Rosthern riding in the 1958 general election, after an unsuccessful bid for the seat in 1953. Nasserden was re-elected in 1962, 1963 and 1965 then with riding boundary changes he was defeated in the 1968 election at Saskatoon—Biggar, losing to Alfred Gleave of the New Democratic Party.

References

External links
 

1919 births
1995 deaths
Members of the House of Commons of Canada from Saskatchewan
Progressive Conservative Party of Canada MPs